Jaime Ramos Hernández (born 9 January 1973) is a Spanish retired footballer who played as a defensive midfielder, and is the current assistant head coach of Elche CF.

Playing career
Born in Madrid, Ramos began his senior career with lowly Real Aranjuez CF. In 1994, he moved to Segunda División's Getafe CF, and made his professional debut on 4 September 1994, starting in a 0–0 home draw against UD Salamanca.

On 8 April 1995 Ramos scored his first professional goal, netting the game's only in a 1–0 home success over CD Ourense. He was an undisputed starter during his two-year spell, suffering relegation in the second.

In the 1996 summer Ramos moved to fellow league team CD Leganés. After three years playing in nearly all league matches, he joined Villarreal CF, also in the second level, winning promotion in his first campaign with the latter.

Ramos made his La Liga debut on 14 January 2001, coming on as a late substitute in a 2–0 home win against Celta de Vigo. His first goal in the competition came on 18 February, the game's winner of a 2–1 win against Real Valladolid also at the Estadio El Madrigal.

Ramos subsequently left the club in June 2001, and signed for Real Murcia in the second division. After appearing sparingly during the 2002–03 season (which ended in promotion), he moved to fellow league team UD Almería, appearing regularly in his three-year stay.

Ramos left the Andalusians in 2006, and subsequently resumed his career in Segunda División B and Tercera División, representing Écija Balompié, UD Alzira, CD San Fernando de Henares and CD Coslada. He retired with the latter in 2012, aged 39.

Managerial career
Shortly after retiring, Ramos joined AFE's staff. In July 2013 he was appointed Francisco's assistant manager at Almería.

On 10 December 2014, after the manager's dismissal, Ramos also left the club. He subsequently followed Francisco to UCAM Murcia CF and CD Lugo, always as an assistant.

References

External links

1973 births
Living people
Footballers from Madrid
Spanish footballers
Association football midfielders
La Liga players
Segunda División players
Segunda División B players
Tercera División players
Getafe CF footballers
CD Leganés players
Villarreal CF players
Real Murcia players
UD Almería players
Écija Balompié players
UD Alzira footballers
UD Almería non-playing staff
Elche CF non-playing staff